Saale may refer to:

Rivers in Germany
 Saale, flowing through Bavaria, Thuringia and Saxony-Anhalt, tributary of the Elbe
 Franconian Saale, flowing through Bavaria, tributary of the Main
 Saale (Leine), flowing through  Lower Saxony, tributary of the Leine

Other
SS Saale, ocean liner for North German Lloyd in the late 19th century